Samith Tillakaratne (born 20 November 1978) was a Sri Lankan cricketer. He was a right-handed batsman and wicket-keeper who played for Tamil Union Cricket and Athletic Club. He was born in Galle.

Tillakaratne made a single first-class appearance for the side, during the 2000–01 season, against Bloomfield Cricket and Athletic Club. From the opening order, he scored 7 runs in the first innings in which he batted, and 9 runs in the second.

External links
Samith Tillakaratne at CricketArchive 

1978 births
Living people
Sri Lankan cricketers
Tamil Union Cricket and Athletic Club cricketers
Cricketers from Galle